John Maitland (1841 – February 1922) was a Liberal Party politician.

He was elected Liberal MP for Kirkcudbright Stewartry in 1874 but stood down at the next election in 1880.

References

External links
 

Scottish Liberal Party MPs
UK MPs 1874–1880
1841 births
1922 deaths